Batillaria zonalis is a species of small sandy shore snail, a marine gastropod mollusk in the family Batillariidae, the horn snails.

Distribution 
 Japan

References

Further reading 
 Driscoll A. L. (1972). "Structure and function of the alimentary tract of Batillaria zonalis and Cerithidea californica: style-bearing mesogastropods". Veliger 14: 375–386.
 (2005) "Phylogeography of the endangered tideland snail Batillaria zonalis in the Japanese and Ryukyu Islands". Ecological Research 
 (2004) "The effect of feeding behavior of the gastropods Batillaria zonalis and Cerithideopsilla cingulata on their ambient environment". abstract

External links

Batillariidae
Gastropods described in 1792
Marine gastropods